Mohammed Ahmed Ali Boqshan or Mohammed Boqshan (born 10 March 1994) is a Yemeni footballer who currently plays as a defender for the Yemen national football team.

Career
Boqshan made his international debut for Yemen in 2012 against Saudi Arabia during the 2012 WAFF Championships group stage in a 1–0 loss. He scored his first international goal against Pakistan during the 2018 World Cup qualifiers in which Yemen ran out 3–1 winners.

International goals
Scores and results list Yemen's goal tally first.

Honours

Club
Al-Tilal SC
 Yemeni Super Cup
 Runners-up (1): 2011

References

External links
 

1994 births
Living people
Yemeni footballers
Yemeni expatriate footballers
Yemen international footballers
Yemeni expatriate sportspeople in Oman
Yemeni expatriate sportspeople in Qatar
Expatriate footballers in Oman
Expatriate footballers in Qatar
Association football defenders
Hassan Abyan players
Al-Tilal SC players
Al-Hilal Al-Sahili players
Al-Nahda Club (Oman) players
Al-Shamal SC players
Al-Khor SC players
Yemeni League players
Oman Professional League players
Qatari Second Division players
Qatar Stars League players
2019 AFC Asian Cup players